Elkanah Billings (May 5, 1820 – June 14, 1876) is often referred to as Canada's first paleontologist. Billings was born on a farm by the Rideau River outside Bytown (Ottawa), now known as Billings Estate. His parents were named Lamira Dow and Braddish Billings. His family included an older sister named Sabra and an older brother Maj Braddish Billings Jr, who practised as an architect and served in the North-West Rebellion. His younger siblings were Samuel, Sarah (known as Sally) and Charles. He was originally educated in law and in 1845, he was called to the Canadian bar.  In 1856, he founded the journal the Canadian Naturalist (and Geologist). He continued to practise law until 1857, when he was hired to be the first paleontologist for Geological Survey of Canada (GSC). In his lifetime, he identified 1065 new species and 61 new genera, including Aspidella, the first documented fossil of the Ediacaran biota.

He married Helen Walker Wilson in 1845.  However, he was childless.

Bibliography 
 Billings E. 1865. Palaeozoic Fossils. Volume I. Containing descriptions and figures of new or little known species of organic remains from the Silurian rocks, 1861-1865. Dawson Brothers, Montreal. Geological Survey of Canada, Separate Report, 426 pp.
Bibliography

References

 Biography at the Dictionary of Canadian Biography Online

Further reading

 with image

External links 
 
 Elkanah Billings: Lawyer/Journalist/Paleontologist Web article developed by the Law Society of Upper Canada Archives

1820 births
1876 deaths
Canadian paleontologists
Geological Survey of Canada personnel
Paleontology in Ontario